Maksim Sergeyevich Volkov (born 17 July 1987) is a Russian former professional football player.

Club career
He made his Russian Football National League debut for FC KAMAZ Naberezhnye Chelny on 19 April 2008 in a game against FC Anzhi Makhachkala.

External links
 

1987 births
Sportspeople from Volgograd
Living people
Russian footballers
Russia youth international footballers
Association football midfielders
FC Olimpia Volgograd players
FC KAMAZ Naberezhnye Chelny players
FC Lada-Tolyatti players
FC Volgar Astrakhan players
FC Ural Yekaterinburg players
FC Baltika Kaliningrad players
FC Sokol Saratov players
FC Sakhalin Yuzhno-Sakhalinsk players
FC Dynamo Stavropol players
FC Avangard Kursk players
FC Dynamo Bryansk players
FC Akron Tolyatti players